Wake Up, O Sleeper is the second full-length album by indie rock band Cool Hand Luke. It was released in 2003 on Floodgate Records.

Track listing
"Heroes Will Be Heroes" - 5:36
"One Time" - 4:49
"This Is Love" - 5:00
"Nobody Hugs a Rose" - 6:10
"So Shall It Be" - 4:04
"Dreams for Sale" - 7:26
"Two Pianos" - 5:28
"Like a Bell Tolling from Another World" - 4:59
"For You" - 5:59
"O Shachah" - 6:52

Trivia
 The title of the album comes from the Bible verse Ephesians 5:14, which is also on the back of the cd booklet, and reads, "Wake up, O sleeper, rise from the dead, and Christ will shine on you."
 The inside of the cd spine reads "You'll cling to what you believe and we'll cling to what we know".
 There is a hidden track located in the pregap of the physical CD. Rewinding the first song when it starts playing will playback the hidden song.

References

2003 albums